Inn of the Damned is a 1975 Australian western horror film, directed by Terry Bourke. It has been called Australia's first "horror Western".

Plot
In 1896, a crazed woman and her husband run an inn in eastern Victoria and take revenge for the deaths of their children years before. Cal Kincaid, an American bounty hunter, arrives to investigate recent murders and puts an end to the killing.

Cast
Judith Anderson as Caroline Straulle
Alex Cord as Cal Kincaid
Michael Craig as Paul Melford
Robert Quilter as Biscayne
Joseph Furst as Lazar Straulle
Tony Bonner as Trooper Moore
John Meillon as George Parr

Production
Like Bourke's previous feature, Night of Fear, the film was originally a one-hour script intended for a projected TV series, Fright.

It was filmed in the Mangrove Mountain region of the NSW Central Coast and at Artransa Studios in Sydney. Filming began in November 1973 and took nine weeks but the film was not released until late in 1975. Shooting was marred by disputes between the producers and its principal investor, Australian Film Development Corporation. At the time it was the most expensive local film made in Australia.

Release

Critical reception 

AllMovie called it "more odd than good", and "best viewed as a curiosity." DVD Verdict wrote, "as curiosities go, this Australian horror western (?) from the early '70s definitely deserves some attention."

Home video 

The film was released on DVD alongside 1972 Australian horror film Night of Fear (also directed by Bourke) by Umbrella Entertainment on 16 March 2005. This combo was re-released for Blu-ray on 09 November 2022 as volume 20 of Umbrella's Ozploitation collection.

References

External links 
 
 
Inn of the Damned at Oz Movies

1975 films
1975 horror films
1970s Western (genre) horror films
Australian Western (genre) horror films
Films set in 1896
Films set in colonial Australia
Films set in hotels
Films set in Victoria (Australia)
Films shot in Sydney
Works about bounty hunters
1970s English-language films
Films directed by Terry Bourke